Corinthians, an association football team based in São Paulo, is one of the successful Brazilian teams in international club competitions. They have won two FIFA Club World Cup titles (in 2000 and 2012), one Copa Libertadores (in 2012) and one Recopa Sudamericana (in 2013), for a total of four international trophies.

Their first participated in international competitions was in 1977, when they qualified for the 18th edition of the Copa Libertadores as the domestic league runner-up. Corinthians then debuted in the Copa Conmebol in 1994, in the inaugural editions of the Copa Mercosur and FIFA Club World Cup in 1998 and 2000, respectively and in the Copa Sudamericana (Copa Conmebol successor) in 2003.

With the 2000 FIFA Club World Championship title, Corinthians became the first team to win this FIFA competition. As South American champions in 2012, they contested their second FIFA Club World Cup and their first Recopa Sudamericana, lifting both trophies in these appearances. Until 2012, Corinthians were the only of São Paulo's "Big Four" clubs yet to win South America's premier club competition – Santos FC and São Paulo FC have each won the Libertadores three times and Palmeiras once.

Current goalkeeper Cassio Ramos holds the record for the most appearances in international competitions (77). Tite is Corinthians's most decorated head coaches, with three international titles.

History

Early decades (1977–99) 

Corinthians first participated in international club competitions in 1977, when they took part in the group stage of the 18th edition of the Libertadores Cup – the highest level of competition in South American club football – as the runners-up in the previous year's Brazilian championship. Their debut against SC Internacional — a club that had beaten Corinthians four months earlier in the 1976 national league finals — at Morumbi Stadium, which the right-back Zé Maria scored the first Corinthians' international football goal. After a 1–1 draw against SC Internacional, the team led by the coach Osvaldo Brandão was defeated away twice by 2–1 against El Nacional and CD Cuenca, respectively, and suffered a setback to the then Brazilian champions by 1–0. With no possibility of advancing to the next stage, Corinthians got their two first victories against Cuenca and El Nacional, and finished their first participation in the South American tournament in third place in their group.

After a 14-year hiatus, Corinthians participated in their second Libertadores in the 1991 season, at this time as the Brazilian national football champion. Coached by Nelsinho Baptista and led by midfielder Neto, Corinthians played with Flamengo, Nacional de Montevideo and Bella Vista, securing the group's runner-up place. Paired with Boca Juniors in the round of 16, they were beaten 3–1 in the first leg match at La Bombonera, and were eliminated with a 1–1 draw in the second leg match at Morumbi Stadium with 65,791 attendance. Two seasons later, Corinthians participated in its first Conmebol Cup in 1994. On that occasion, the team coached by Jair Pereira sailed into the semi-finals, where they were defeated by the eventual competition winners, São Paulo FC, in a penalty shootout after a victory for each side. Corinthians returned the following season to this tournament, but they fell to América de Cali in the quarter-finals.

Corinthians entered the 1996 Libertadores following their first Brazilian Cup final win in mid-1995. Coached by Eduardo Amorim and counting on names as Marcelinho Carioca and Edmundo in their squad, they were confirmed as group winners over Universidad de Chile, Botafogo and Universidad Católica. In the round of 16, they eliminated CD Espoli and reached the Libertadores quarter-finals for the first time in their history Facing Grêmio, the 1995 Libertadores holders, and that game meant like a final for Corinthians. In the first leg match, they were surprised at Pacaembu Stadium with a 3–0 home defeat. Despite a 1–0 victory away, Corinthians were eliminated on aggregate score. Two years later, the club participated in the first edition of the Copa Mercosur, but their campaign finished outside of their group's top two places.

Getting their second Brazilian Championship title with Vanderley Luxemburgo, Corinthians reach the 1999 Libertadores. In February, Evaristo de Macedo was hired to lead the club in the highest South American competition. In the group stage, Corinthians faced the Cerro Porteño, Olimpia and the rival Palmeiras. With athletes as Carlos Gamarra, Vampeta, Freddy Rincón, Ricardinho, Marcelinho Carioca, Edílson and Fernando Baiano in their squad, Corinthians were confirmed as group winners. One of the highlights of that campaign was the 8–2 victory against Cerro Porteño — with five goals scored by Fernando Baiano. Despite eliminated CD Jorge Wilstermann in the round of 16, Macedo resigned three days before the quarter-final matchups against their most bitter rivals Palmeiras. Interim manager Oswaldo de Oliveira led Corinthians in the two games at Morumbi. Although more than 30 shots on target against Palmeiras, Corinthians were defeated by 2–0 in the first leg. Corinthians won 2–0 in the second leg, but lost 4–2 on penalties. Also that season, the club participated in their second Copa Mercosur, but were eliminated in the quarter-finals against San Lorenzo de Almagro.

World Champion Clubs and frustrations in South America (2000–2010) 

One of eight teams participating in the inaugural FIFA Club World Cup in 2000, as Corinthians being nominated by the Brazilian Football Confederation as the host country's representative in the new competition. The 1999 Brazilian Championship holders had overcome their third national league with key players such as Dida, Freddy Rincón, Vampeta, Ricardinho, Marcelinho Carioca, Edílson and Luizão. Corinthians began their campaign beating the African champions Raja by 2–0. In the second round, they secured a 2–2 draw with Real Madrid, with highlights to the performances of Edílson, scorer of two goals, and goalkeeper Dida, who saved a late penalty from Nicolas Anelka A hard-fought 2–0 victory over Al-Nassr confirmed Corinthians as group winners and sealed them in the final in Rio de Janeiro. The opponent was Vasco da Gama, winner of the other group. With more than 73,000-strong crowd of supporters, mostly in favour of the Carioca team, in the Maracanã Stadium, the two teams played a match marked by few offensive moves. Faced with a goalless draw after regulation and extra time, the game was decided by a penalty-kick shootout. Rincón, Fernando Baiano, Luizão and Edu scored the first four penalties to Corinthians, and Dida saved a penalty from Gilberto. Although Marcelinho Carioca was denied by Helton, Edmundo missed his spot-kick, Corinthians won 4–3 and crowned the first ever FIFA world club champions. In addition, that title also represented their first international glory in the Corinthians history.

Four weeks after, Corinthians began their 2000 Libertadores journey full of expectations that they could finally win the highest South America trophy, which was an obsession with supporters, players and backroom staff alike. However, the club struggled to qualify at first place in the group with América, Olimpia and LDU Quito. They eliminated Racing Avellaneda in the round of 16 and Atlético Mineiro in the quarter-finals to reach their first Libertadores semi-final. On their way was rival Palmeiras, the Corinthians' tormentor in the previous Libertadores. In the first leg, Corinthians overcome 4–3 with a Vampeta's late goal. After the 3–2 defeat in the second leg, they were knocked out on penalties when Corinthians idol Marcelinho Carioca missed the last and deciding spot kick.

After the toughest Libertadores exit in their history, Corinthians had also a disappointing campaign in the Copa Mercosur that season. Have started this competition with Oswaldo Alvarez as coach and ended with Candinho in that position, Corinthians registered any victory in six matches, finishing in the fourth and last place in their group. Coached by Vandelei Luxemburgo, Corinthians' last participation in the Copa Mercosur, in the following year, ended in the semi-finals, when they felt to San Lorenzo de Almagro after a 2–1 home win and a heavy 4–1 away defeat.

In 2002, the club won their second Brazilian Cup and qualified for the 2003 Copa Libertadores. In a stage group with Cruz Azul, Fénix and The Strongest, the Corinthian squad coached by Geninho had the best campaign of the first phase, with five wins in six games. Facing River Plate in the round of 16 with a first leg away, Corinthians opened the score at Monumental de Nuñez, but they fell to the rival's provocation, having a player sent off and conceding two goals in the last minutes. The second match, in Morumbi, followed a similar script. Corinthians scored the first goal, but they lost their temper over River gamesmanship and suffered a come-from-behind defeat by 2–1 once again. Corinthians participated in the Copa Sudamericana that season, a competition that replaced the Copa Mercosur, but they were eliminated in the preliminary phase. Corinthians returned to this tournament two years later, but fell to Pumas UNAM at the quarter-finals.

Corinthians secured their fourth Brazilian league to earn a place in the 2006 Copa Libertadores. With a squad assembled by Media Sports Investment, composed of athletes such as Carlos Tevez, Javier Mascherano and Carlos Alberto, Corinthians – who began this competition with Daniel Passarella as their coach, but they sacked him and hired Antonio Lopes – finished in first in their group with Tigres UANL, Universidad Católica and Deportivo Cali. In the round of 16, Corinthians faced River Plate, the club's tormentor three years earlier. The 3–2 away loss in the first leg was marked by two mistakes of referee Carlos Amarilla, who disallowed a legitimate goal by Tevez and sent off Mascherano for a non-existent foul. Pressured in the return game at Pacaembu, Corinthians opened the score in the first half, but they could not control their emotions in the second half and suffered three goals within 25 minutes. Irate Corinthians fans invaded the pitch, causing an upheaval that prompted the police to intervene and the match had to be ended before the 90th minute. Months later, with Emerson Leão as their coach, the club felt to Lanús in the round of 16 of the Copa Sudamericana that season. The 2007 disastrous Corinthians' season, when they were relegated to the Brazilian second tier of the following year, was preceded by a meager participation in the Copa Sudamericana that year.

Back to the top flight in 2009 and having guided by the coach Mano Menezes and the striker Ronaldo, Corinthians won their third Brazilian Cup and qualified for the Copa Libertadores of the following season. Also featuring Roberto Carlos in their ranks to win the South American highest competition to celebrate their centenary, Corinthians surpassed Racing Montevideo, Independiente Medellín and Cerro Porteño and confirmed their favoritism as group winners with five wins and a draw in six matches, thus guaranteeing the best campaign among the 16 classified for the knockout stage. Corinthians then faced Flamengo in the round of 16; after a 1–0 loss at Maracanã, Corinthians' 2–1 win was insufficient to avoid elimination on the away goals rule. As Menezes was presented as the Brazil national football team's manager, Corinthians signed Tite as their new coach. Sitting third in the Brazilian league, Corinthians qualified for the 2011 Copa Libertadores preliminary stage. Paired with Tolima, Corinthians drew the first leg match in Brazil, but were knocked out with a 2–0 loss in Ibagué.

The first Libertadores and world champion again (2012–2016) 

Despite the most embarrassing Libertadores defeat in their history, Corinthians kept Tite as their coach, they clinched their fifth Brazilian national championship – on a day when Socrates, one of their former stars, died – and reached a spot in the 2012 Copa Libertadores group stage. Their campaign began in a group comprising Deportivo Táchira, Nacional Asunción, and Cruz Azul. They qualified for the knockout phase as group winners, snatching four wins and two draws in six matches. Having the second best campaign among the 16 qualified, Corinthians faced Emelec, holder of the second worst campaign among the runners-up, in the round of 16. With Cássio making his debut in the starting lineup, a goalless first leg match in Guayaquil postponed the decision to the Pacaembu Stadium, where Fábio Santos, Paulinho and Alex ensured a 3–0 victory to put Corinthians in the next round. The quarter-final matchup against Vasco da Gama was set as part of the fixed bracket produced by the round of 16 pairing. In Rio de Janeiro, a goalless draw in the first leg left the Paulistas with the obligation to win in order to qualify – any draw with goals would be a favorable result for the Cariocas on the away goals rule. At Pacaembu, the game produced more crunching tackles than clearcut chances. Vasco had two good ones in the second half when Diego Souza galloped clear of the Corinthians defense, but had his effort saved by Cassio, then Nilton headed against the post. Instead, Paulinho rose up to make a header from a corner in the 87th minute, and Corinthians snatched 1–0 victory to advance to the semi-finals for the first time since 2000. Corinthians faced the holders Santos and overcome the first leg 1–0 in Vila Belmiro Stadium, where Emerson scored a brilliant goal in a match marred by a 20-minute delay after a power outage in the 82nd minute. At home, Corinthians was at a disadvantage when Neymar opened the score for Santos in the 35th minute, but Corinthians recovered from the setback and equalised just two minutes into the second half when Alex swung over a free kick and the ball fell to Danilo, who sidefooted it into the goal. This 1–1 draw edged out compatriots Santos on aggregate and put the Brazilian giants Corinthians in the Libertadores finals for the first time in their history. The other finalists were the six times winners Boca Juniors, who had eliminated Universidad de Chile in the other semi-final.

At La Bombonera in Buenos Aires, Facundo Roncaglia put Boca ahead in the 72nd minute, but substitute Romarinho gathered a pass and lobbed a perfectly weighted shot over the fallen Boca goalkeeper Agustín Orión six minutes from time, that gave Corinthians a 1–1 away draw in the first leg of the Copa Libertadores finals. At a packed Pacaembu stadium, Corinthians who took the lead in the 54th minute after Emerson has pounced on playmaker Danilo's back-heel after Boca's defense failed to clear the ball from a free-kick. In the 72nd minute, Boca came close with a header that was saved by Cassio, but just seconds later Rolando Schiavi gave the ball away and Emerson sprinted 45 yards to slot coolly the ball home, firing Corinthians to a 2–0 win in the second leg of the final (3–1 on aggregate) and secure their Copa Libertadores. Also the result means Corinthians went through the competition unbeaten, ending up with eight wins and six draws and becoming the sixth club to win Libertadores after an uninterrupted sequence of success, following after Peñarol (7-streak games in 1960), Santos (4-streak games in 1963), Independiente (7-streak games in 1964), Estudiantes (4-streak games both in 1969 and 1970) and Boca Juniors (6-streak games in 1978). Yet the club has just conceded four goals in 14 games.

Twelve years ago after they had won the inaugural event in Brazil, Corinthians traveled to Japan to the 2012 FIFA Club World Cup. The São Paulo's main airport had been invaded by 15,000 supporters, who gave a loud send-off to the Corinthian squad before the departure. Also a similar number of fans made the trip to Japan to roar on their side. Corinthians entered as semi-finalists and played against Al-Ahly who had eliminated Sanfrecce Hiroshima in the quarter-finals. At Toyota Stadium, the Brazilian club have booked their spot in the Club World Cup final after defeating the African champions by 1–0, when Douglas sent a superb cross into the box and Paolo Guerrero headed into the net of Al-Ahly goalkeeper Sherif Ekramy in the 29th minute. The other finalist was Chelsea, who beat Monterrey in the other semi-final. Around 30,000 of Corinthian fans cheered and supported the team in the final at Yokohama International Stadium, which hosted 68,275 spectators at all. In the first 45 minutes, Corinthians-Chelsea did a decent half matchup with chances at both ends. But Chelsea were more dangerous when Gary Cahill and Victor Moses missed good opportunities, but both were denied by brilliant saves from goalkeeper Cassio. In the 69th minute, Corinthians went ahead when Paulinho collected a pass and ran into the penalty area, but the ball fell to Danilo who cut inside and saw his shot loop up off Cahill before Guerrero headed the loose ball from five yards in off the underside of the bar, despite two Chelsea players on the line. Four minutes from time, Fernando Torres had a glorious chance to level when he had only Cassio to beat but he fires it right at the keeper. The 1–0 win crowned Corinthians FIFA world club champions for the second time in their history and joined FC Barcelona at that time as being the only teams to have won the title twice. Cassio's great performance awarded him as the tournament MVP.

No longer carrying the burden of winning a Libertadores, Corinthians started their following international season with a guaranteed spot as holders in the group stage of the 2013 South American tournament. The 1–1 draw away in their opening game against San José in Oruro was ofuscated by the death of Kevin Beltrán Spada, victim of a flare shot at the Jesús Bermúdez Stadium. As the incident was provoked by Corinthians fans, the Brazilian club was punished by CONMEBOL and forced to play behind closed doors against Millonarios at Pacaembu. The defending champions advanced to the round of 16 as their group stage winner. Facing Boca Juniors away for the first leg, Corinthians were defeated by 1–0. At Pacaembu, Román Riquelme opened the scoring in the 25th minute and Paulinho equalised early in the second half. Corinthians had to find the net two more times to advance, but they hadn't and the 1–1 draw at home eliminated the holders. However, Carlos Amarilla's refereeing was loudly criticized by the Brazilian side, which complained especially after two Corinthians goals were disallowed and two penalties were allegedly ignored by the Paraguayan referee. According to recordings of phone conversations between Argentine officials, revealed two years after the match by the Argentina's America TV channel, Amarilla was picked to help Boca. In one of the recordings, the Argentinian football godfather Julio Grondona, then president of the Argentine Football Association, hinted that "the guy who gave Boca the best support it had last year was [referee Carlos] Amarilla". Despite the frustration with the elimination in Libertadores, Corinthians ended their continental season contesting the 2013 Recopa Sudamericana against São Paulo, 2012 Copa Sudamericana holders, in July. Corinthians overcome the first leg 2–1 away and the second leg 2–0 at home, becoming champion of this competition for the first time.

After a season without qualifying for South American competitions, Corinthians had a spot in a qualifying round of 2015 Copa Libertadores. They won 4–0 Once Caldas in the first international club competition match at the Arena Corinthians and draw 0–0 away, reaching the group stage, where they played São Paulo Danubio and defending champions San Lorenzo de Almagro. The good campaign in this stage guaranteed the first place to Corinthians, were subsequently knocked out in the round of 16 after a surprising 3–0 defeated on aggregate against Guaraní. Around six months later, Corinthians were crowned Brazilian winners for the sixth time and reached the Libertadores in the following season. The club won their group stage comprising by Cerro Porteño, Independiente Santa Fe and Cobresal. However, in the round of 16, they were knocked out on the away goals rule after two game-tying against Nacional de Montevideo. Soon after this matchup, Tite stepped down Corinthians to coach Brazil national football team.

Recent years (2017–present) 
After the exit of their most successful coach, Corinthians initially hired outsiders until has given a chance Tite's former assistant Fabio Carille. His first international competition was the 2017 Copa Sudamericana, which Corinthians fell undefeated in the round of 16 after two draws on aggregate against Racing Avellaneda. The club ensured a place in 2018 Copa Libertadores group stage after winning their seventh Brazilian championship title. Despite the first place in the group stage, Corinthians has only defeated Deportivo Lara at their home ground, and lost another two matches against Independiente and Millonarios – this one under new coach Osmar Loss, who has taken over after the Carille's departure. Corinthians then faced Colo-Colo in the round of 16; after a 1–0 loss at Santiago, the 3–1 victory at home was insufficient to avoid elimination on the away goals rule.

With Carille back in charge of the team the following season, Corinthians reached the semi-finals of the 2019 Copa Sudamericana, where they fell to Independiente del Valle. Qualified for the preliminary round of the 2020 Copa Libertadores, Corinthians were beaten by Guaraní after a 2–2 aggregate score, with the Paraguayan side going through on the away goals rule. The 2021 Copa Sudamericana participation was short-lived as Corinthians finished outside of their group top place, which included a 4–0 away defeat against Peñarol that was, at the time, club's heaviest in South America. Qualified for the Copa Libertadores in the following season, Corinthians hired the Portuguese Vítor Pereira as their new coach to replace Sylvinho, who was fired at the beginning of the February due to a poor run of results. Despite they have reached their first quarter-finals spot since 2012 after heroic triumph on penalties against Boca Juniors at La Bombonera, Corinthians had so many difficulties throughout the competition, specially with injured starting players out and a clear game plan. Beaten by Flamengo 0–3 on aggregate, they have won only two of ten matches and scored 5 goals in their campaign.

Records 

Key

P = Matches played
W = Matches won
D = Matches drawn
L = Matches lost
GF = Goals for
GA = Goals against
GD = Goal difference
F = Finals
FW = Finals won
FL = Finals lost
GS = Group stage
GS2 = Second group stage
PO = Play-off round
PR = Preliminary round
Q3 = Third qualifying round
QF = Quarter-finals
R1 = First round
R2 = Second round
R3 = Third round
R16 = Round of 16
R32 = Round of 32
SF = Semi-finals
 = Winners
 = Runners-up

Team, coaches and players

First match: 1–1 vs Internacional, 1977 Copa Libertadores group stage, at Morumbi Stadium (3 April 1977).
First goal: Zé Maria, against Internacional, 1977 Copa Libertadores group stage, at Morumbi Stadium (3 April 1977).
Biggest home win: 8–2 vs Cerro Porteño, 1999 Copa Libertadores group stage, at Pacaembu Stadium (10 March 1999).
Biggest away win: 2–7 vs Deportivo Lara, 2018 Copa Libertadores group stage, at Metropolitano de Lara (17 May 2018).
Biggest home loss: 0–4 vs Cruzeiro, 2001 Copa Mercorsur group stage, at Pacaembu Stadium (17 October 2001).
Biggest away loss: 0–4 vs Peñarol, 2021 Copa Sudamericana group stage, at (13 May 2021).
Record home attendance: 94,239 fans vs Internacional, in the 1977 Libertadores group stage, at Morumbi Stadium (3 April 1977).
Player with most total appearances: Cássio, 77.
Player with most goals scored: Luizão, 22.
Coach with most matches: Tite, 48.
Coach with most titles: Tite, 3.

By season

By competition

Finals 
Matches won after regular time (90 minutes of play), extra-time (aet) or a penalty shootout (p) are highlighted in green, while losses are highlighted in red.

Honours

See also 

Football in Brazil

References

Bibliography 

 

 

 

Sport Club Corinthians Paulista
Brazilian football clubs in international competitions